Mohammad Yousef al-Malkawi ( moˈhɑːmed ˈjuːsef mælkaʊi, born 1943), is a Jordanian general and politician. He was the former King's Chancellor. also, he held the post of Chairman of the Joint Chiefs of Staff of the Jordanian Armed Forces from 18 July 1999, to 5 March 2002. Currently, Malkawi is a member of the Jordanian Senate.

References

Jordanian generals
20th-century Jordanian people